Michael Bondesio (born 10 March 1985) is a former South African rugby union footballer. His regular playing position was scrum-half.

A persistent leg injury led to long lay-offs for Bondesio and eventually his retirement at the end of the 2014 season.

Bondesio is a qualified teacher and started teaching at Hoërskool Linden at the start of 2015. He was also appointed as the assistant coach of club side Pirates.

References

External links

Lions profile
itsrugby.co.uk profile

Living people
1985 births
South African rugby union players
Rugby union scrum-halves
White South African people
Golden Lions players
Lions (United Rugby Championship) players
Leopards (rugby union) players
People from Middelburg, Mpumalanga
Rugby union players from Mpumalanga